This is a list of characters from the Japanese visual novel and manga series Little Busters!. The main protagonist is Riki Naoe, a young man in high school who is a member of a tight-knit group of five friends known as the Little Busters. The leader of the Little Busters is Kyousuke Natsume, and he is one year older than the other four members; he often comes up with absurd ideas, but almost always follows up with a reasonable explanation along with it. The third member of the group is Masato Inohara, Riki's roommate, who loves to work out and improve his muscle mass. The next member is Kengo Miyazawa, who is skilled in the art of kendo and seemingly has a cynical personality, but his passion for the Little Busters is unmatched by anyone. The final member of the Little Busters is the only female, and Kyousuke's younger sister, Rin Natsume. Rin, who is also the main heroine in the story, does not communicate well and is seen as inarticulate; due to this, she is anti-social, and is usually seen alone.

There are five other heroines in Little Busters!, starting with Komari Kamikita, a very childish girl who takes great interest in fairy-tales, picture books, candy, and clothing with many layers of frills. She is very clumsy, and will often not think before she acts. Next is Haruka Saigusa, a schoolmate of Riki's from a different class, but despite this, always seems to find time to hang around in Riki's classroom. She is a problem child and will start an uproar for her own personal enjoyment. Another heroine is Kudryavka Noumi, is a girl who is a quarter Japanese, and three-quarters Russian. Her grandfather had great interest in Japanese culture, and per his influence on her, she learned much about the Japanese culture, including the language. Following her is Yuiko Kurugaya, who is seen as an older sister to everyone despite being the same age of almost the entire cast. She is fond of things or people she considers to be cute, such as several of the female cast of characters. The final heroine is Mio Nishizono, a calm girl who is very diligent. Due to having weak health, she is always seen with a parasol when outside.

There are two additional characters which were originally supporting characters to further the overall story and influence scenarios, but were promoted to heroine status in Little Busters! Ecstasy. One of these characters is Kanata Futaki, a girl at Riki's school and the public morals chairman, which means when Haruka causes trouble, Kanata must run after her; Kanata is Haruka's twin sister. Sasami Sasasegawa is another, who is Rin's rival; due to this, she will often get in a fight with Rin. Other characters play more minor roles, such as Miyuki Koshiki, a girl in the archery club who lost her right eye due to an archery accident; Midori, who is Mio's forgotten imaginary sister; and Kojirō Kamikita, Komari's grandfather who lives in a nursing home Komari and Riki volunteer at. A new heroine named Saya Tokido makes her appearance in Ecstasy. She is popular at school, but most do not know is that she also comes to school at night to fight and protect a "treasure".

Little Busters members

Original members

Riki is the male protagonist of Little Busters! and the role the player assumes in the game. He is the fifth member of the Little Busters, and of all of them, he is seen as the weakest due to his girlish appearance and physical build, but he is the only one among them who is straightforward and has common sense. His parents died when he was very young, and around the same time, he was diagnosed with narcolepsy. Riki is the weakest of the original five members, but his starting attribute values increase on each play through and can eventually match and outgrow Kyousuke's statistics.

Rin is the main heroine in the story. She is the younger sister of Kyousuke Natsume and is the only female member out of the five original members of the Little Busters. She does not communicate well and is seen as inarticulate. Rin loves cats and at school takes care of several strays; it is not uncommon for several cats to crawl onto her. Rin often has a white kitten named  with her which rides either on her head or shoulder. Rin's name means "bell", and she wears a bell in her hair.
Players can also make Rin go on a mission to fight a mysterious creature during gameplay. She must face the creature a total of four times; the last two fights must be done in a single day.

Kyousuke is the leader of the Little Busters and one year older than the other four members. He often comes up with absurd ideas, but he almost always follows up with a reasonable explanation along with it. He suffers from a brother-sister complex, as he wants his sister Rin to call him onii-chan (meaning brother in an affectionate way), but Rin does not want to, preferring to call him by his name. Kyosuke is one of the most active players on the baseball field. It is vital to hit the balls to him during practice sessions if the player wants to raise Riki's statistics faster for a battle ranking game.

Masato is a member of the Little Busters and Riki's roommate. He has a particular fondness for Riki, which he is more than willing to express out aloud. In Refrain, he left the Little Busters, thinking Riki is not strong enough to lead the group. Masato has the highest starting strength and stamina points out of all characters in the game. His low concentration and judgment points mean he is more likely to make tactical errors during the baseball game. Depending on the choice the player makes on May 17, however, his skills during the baseball game can be increased further, though he still has a tendency to make mistakes.

Kengo is a member of the Little Busters. He is skilled in the art of kendo and seemingly has a cynical personality, but his passion for the Little Busters is unmatched by anyone. Kengo is recruited after Masato, Kyousuke, and Rin defeat his father, making him the fourth member of Little Busters.
Kengo has the second-highest starting strength and stamina, and is also reasonably high on reflex and agility. If the player manages to record more than five-hundred hits during practice session before he joins the team, his skills during the baseball game will increase tremendously. For battle, he has a tendency to stack up stamina-enhancing accessories (which, not surprisingly, are protective armor parts from his kendo club) so defense-wise, he can be quite resilient.

Additional members

Komari is very childish, taking great interest in fairytales, picture books, candy, and clothing with many layers of frills. In Refrain, after Rin remembers everything in her final dream, she rushes to Komari, who gives Rin her hair ornament, before disappearing, telling her to be strong.
Komari is one of the weakest characters along with Kudryavka, but she has the fastest growth rate of any character in the game. If the player chooses to raise her statistics by hitting the ball to her during a practice session, which can be fairly difficult especially while she is running, she can be made into a valuable player in the field.

Haruka is Riki's schoolmate of Riki's from a different class. She causes disturbances for her own personal enjoyment, which causes her twin sister, the public morals chairman Kanata Futaki, to often chase after her.
Haruka is a reasonably agile character, but has poor concentration and judgment values, which often causes her to make poor decisions in battle and baseball games. She is one of the most active players on the baseball field, however, so it is recommended that she is set as an outfielder for the baseball game. During practice, there is a chance that she will fail to catch the ball, though this happens very rarely.

Her full Russian name is Kudryavka Anatolyevna Strugatskaya. Her grandmother is Japanese. Her grandfather was interested in Japanese culture and per his influence on her, she also learned much about Japanese culture, including the language. Despite having a poor handle on the English language, she was able to skip a year in school due to credits obtained through studying abroad. She is Riki's classmate and is in the newly formed home economics club due to an invitation of the head of the dormitory she lives at with the other characters. Kudryavka and the dormitory head are the only two members, and since the latter is often too busy, club activities are suspended and Kudryavka is the sole active member of a club on the verge of being disbanded. Before joining the home economics club, Kudryavka had been a member of the furniture club before it was disbanded.
Kudryavka has two dogs: a large female Siberian Husky named , and a small Schipperke named . The hat and cloak that she wears were handmade. She spent most of her childhood traveling around the world, and her home country is a small, fictional southern island (called Tebwa, or otherwise Republic of Novaya Tebwi Ma Tenua or Republic of N.T.M.T for short, a former Soviet Union territory) closer to the equator; this is the reason for her hat and cloak—she finds Japan cold due to her country's climate. For the two endings, she can either choose not to return to her home country and become overwhelmed with guilt and regret when she sees her mother's public execution on television, which results in her bad ending; or, for the good ending, she chooses to return but gets captured by rebels in her home country (which is in a state of civil war), eventually escaping prison and returning to Japan due to her strong love for Riki.

Kudryavka, along with Komari, is one of the weakest character in the game, and since she does not have the growth rate of Komari, her usage can be quite limited. In battle, however, Kudryavka can use dog items to summon her dogs as a weapon, which can often turn the tide of the battle. In baseball, she does surprisingly well in catching balls, and like Komari, her bonus increment statistics by hitting balls to her is fairly large, so she is a good choice as an outfielder.

Kudryavka's route includes an Easter egg ending, called "Muscle Sensation". To watch this, the player must choose to play with Masato every time the choice is presented throughout her route, and generally choose choices that favor Masato, such as who Kudryavka should study with, while going through Kudryavka's route. This ending is not required to progress the game—it is simply there for humorous factor.

Yuiko is Riki's classmate who has a self-sufficient personality. She is sometimes seen carrying a replica of a katana called Muramasa. She is fond of things or people she considers to be cute, such as several of the female cast of characters, especially Kudryavka in particular. She is also seen as the most invincible member of the Little Busters, having defeated Masato, Kengo and Kyousuke, which traumatizes them. Rin is also afraid of her since Yuiko is the only one who can contain and play around with her, much to Rin's dismay. Yuiko gets high grades in school, especially in math, and is hated by her first year math teacher and several female students, who plan on bullying the Little Busters by first affixing nails and chewing gum to Riki's shoes. She was born outside Japan, but is still entirely Japanese. Kengo was her classmate during her first year.

Yuiko is the strongest female character in the game until player completes all heroine's route; In which case, Rin can effectively compete with her in terms of statistics. She is the only character that is capable of using a sword or a machine gun as a weapon during battle and she is also the most reflexive and agile character in all aspects. Since she has relatively high attribute values on everything except strength and stamina, which are above-average among the female characters, she is an extremely capable player on the baseball field, whether infield or outfield, and she almost always succeeds in stealing bases.

Mio is a calm girl who is very diligent. Due to having weak health, she is always seen with a parasol when outside. She enjoys reading, especially when the story contains boys love elements, and her room is filled with books. She carries around a book of poems by Bokusui Wakayama. In the real world, she was feeling guilty over having forgotten an imaginary friend she used to have, who comes to life in the artificial world as Midori. She uses the parasol because she is trying to hide that she has no shadow; this is due to Midori using Mio's shadow to materialize her own body. Mio was originally designed by Na-Ga to wear glasses, but this was later dropped. However, players can still view her CG with glasses during Riki's déjà vu flashback of Mio, though this is meant to be a deception by Midori.

Despite having weak health, Mio's weak body (and consequently her statistics) can be deceiving as she is quite powerful enough to hold a couple dozen of books, as well as being able to chastise Haruka, much to her dismay. She is also the only character that can use special weapons given by the science team during battle, which can be extremely damaging to her opponent. The damage capability, however, is unpredictable in each fight, which is determined by whether Mio's "NYP" value measured at the beginning of each fight is high or low. She is also a character that receives the largest amount of bonus increment statistics during baseball practice sessions due to her often being in hard-to-hit at places. It is useless to raise her statistics, however, as she does not participate in the baseball game.

Additional heroines in Ecstasy

The additional heroines are unlocked when the player completes all the scenarios, including Refrain. However, if the player answers 'yes' when asked if the player already knows the secret of the world, the player can play through their scenarios without any requirements. This question is asked only once, either right after the game is installed or clearing the save data in the install directory.

Kanata is a girl at Riki's school and is the public morals chairman, which means when Haruka causes trouble, Kanata must run after her. To help Kanata, Kudryavka offered up her two dogs Strelka and Belka to patrol the school grounds and help in hunting down Haruka when she causes trouble. Kanata is Haruka's twin sister, though this is only revealed later. She acts extremely cold to Haruka, although it is later revealed she is forced to treat Haruka coldly by her kinsmen, and actually made efforts to release Haruka from them. Kanata is annoyed at Riki's close approach to her sister and often tells Riki to stay away from Haruka, wondering why someone normal like Riki would want to approach her twin. Since the only real difference between Haruka and Kanata is their eye color, Kanata uses this to her advantage when she impersonates her sister with colored contacts. Kanata cooks well, while Haruka does not, and this is one of the few ways to identify her when she is impersonating Haruka.

Sasami is a girl at Riki's school and is Rin's rival; surprisingly, while Rin loves cats, Sasami is a devoted dog lover. Her name is thought to be a tongue twister, which even she manages to mix up. She has a romantic interest in Kengo Miyazawa, but Kengo has no interest in returning her favor. If the player goes for a second play through after the baseball match, the player can see the event when Sasami helps take a group photo for the Little Busters, a photo which helps Rin in regaining her memories in her final dream; this event only happens once. The reason for her avoiding cats is due to the disappearance of her own cat Kuro during her childhood. In Sasami's route, which happens after the events in Refrain, Sasami's cat Kuro created a world similar to the Little Busters! world around the school in order to meet Sasami one last time before dying.

Sasami is the only secondary character in the original Little Busters! game, other than the softball girls, that is given her own statistics. During the first and second play through, her statistics are too high for Rin to effectively compete with her. Rin stands a much better chance against Sasami at around the player's third play through, and when she wins against Sasami, she can obtain an item for Riki to use, which can be a godsend for him during a battle ranking game, especially if he receives an accessory that increases his agility or reflexes. The maximum number of times she can be fought is six, but only if the player decides to go through Rin's path while she is still unsociable. Otherwise, the player would face Sasami five times, but this can be minimized to three if Rin is on the mission to fight a mysterious creature.

Saya is a new heroine who only appears in Little Busters! Ecstasy. In the daytime, she is a popular girl in her class at Riki's school due to her attractive face and figure, though is known to be a natural airhead.

Saya's true identity is Aya, a normal girl with a father as a doctor, who volunteered in various countries that are not well-off. Since they had to move frequently, she did not have enough time for any deep relationships with others or school. During her childhood, she briefly befriended Riki during her brief stay in Japan, playing soccer with each other. One day, when Saya and her father were about to return to Japan and end their traveling, Aya became involved in an accident due to a flood. She was on the verge of death when she, by chance, noticed the artificial world Kyousuke has created and decided to enter it. Inside, she materialized as Saya Tokido, a character from Kyousuke's favorite manga, which incidentally happened to be her favorite as well, given to her by a Japanese tourist. Due to this, Kyousuke originally thought she was created due to his hidden desire, and intended to leave her alone, but after seeing her interacting with Riki, he realizes that she is actually an "interloper" to his world and tries to make her leave, since her existence causes Riki to stray away from the others because of a lot of reasons: Saya is a spy so he has to keep her identity in secret, he doesn't want to involve the other LB! members with the "darkness executives" and of course because he fell in love with her so much that his feelings for Saya remain even after the "resets", at the point that he prefer spend his time with Saya rather than with the others. Also, the head of the "Darkness Executives", Tokikaze Shun (who is actually Kyousuke role-playing the main antagonist from Saya Tokido's manga) tells Saya at the beginning (and each subsequent replay) that if she want to leave the dream world, she just has to pull the trigger on herself.
In one of the last loops, Saya acceded to leave the dream world and Kyousuke promised grant her final wish. In the very end of her route Saya shoot herself in the head and leave the dream world. Her status in the real world after leaving the dream world is uncertain, but most likely she died due to her accident since her situation was very hopeless.

Saya's route can confuse many players due to two reasons. During the "replay" portion, which is in Saya's perspective, it is nearly impossible to avoid death. The player is actually required to die several times, then choose "replay" in the game over screen in order to progress with her route. Also, at the end of the maze, the game abruptly sends the player back to the title screen, which can also cause confusion. To proceed with her route, the player must actually go through Saya's route once again, and the first choice the player makes during May 17 will determine if the player will receive a bad ending or a good one. After her true ending, her route will no longer be playable until the player completes up to the Refrain route. In this case, when the player starts a new game, the game will ask if the player wants to make Saya's route playable again.
 
Saya is only involved in two mini-games, shooting and baseball practice. Despite this, she has no direct involvement except for the shooting mini-game, which players will be able to play through Saya's perspective during the "replay" portion of her route. During baseball practice, if the player is playing through Saya's route, she will be seen in the field hiding behind a wooden drum. If the player hits the ball to her, she will either snipe and destroy the ball, or shoot the ball back to the player, allowing for more combos. During Saya's route, players will not be able to participate in the battle ranking game midway through, but early on, she sometimes appears to assist Riki during battle. Also, players cannot play the baseball match during Saya's route, so it is largely useless to raise anyone's statistics.

Secondary characters

Miyuki is a girl in the archery club who lost her right eye due to an archery accident. Her family is known for being skilled in archery. Due to being in a similar situation of Kengo, she worries about him. She committed suicide in the real world, unlike the artificial world where Kengo saves her from this act. Kyousuke creates an illusion of her to distract Kengo during a baseball game set by Kengo to thwart Kyousuke's plan, as it is too harsh for Riki and Rin. This angers Kengo to the point where he charges and attacks Kyousuke.

Midori is Mio's forgotten imaginary sister who comes to life in the artificial world and takes Mio's place. Her personality is the direct opposite of Mio. She materializes due to taking Mio's shadow, so she herself has no shadow, but she does not hide it, unlike Mio.

Kojirō is an old man in a nursing home Komari and Riki volunteer at. He has trouble keeping his room clean. He is Komari's grandfather, although this is revealed later as he refused to tell Riki about his relationship with Komari. He is actually escaping from Komari, after she becomes insane for the first time and treats him like her dead brother.

Komari's older brother. He has a weak physical appearance and because of his long stay in the hospital, he is always seen  wearing pajamas. Despite being sick, he was still a friendly guy who liked to draw and create stories, and always taking care of his younger sister. Because of his illness, he lived in a hospital room that was close to his house where his sister would visit him as a child. It is unknown what illness he suffered from, but it was presumably serious as he was confined to staying within the hospital, The night before he died, he told Komari that she might not be able to see him when she wakes up in the morning, but that she did not have to mourn for him, because it would be a dream. He hoped that by telling her this, she would not grieve too much over his passing, and that she would retain her smile.

Kudryavka's mother, and the daughter of Ivan Strugatskaya. Chernushka is half-Russian, half-Japanese. Because of this, she has black hair and has the nickname "Blackie". When she was younger, she used to wear a hat and cape just like her daughter.

A five year-old girl. She is one of the children Rin meets and does the puppet show for; After Rin gets a mission from Lennon to "do the puppet show", she meets Yumi and her friends. Tarou accidentally broke Yumi's doll while playing baseball. Ami wanted to give her a puppet show for her birthday but can't anymore; so Rin promises the kids she will fix the doll and do the puppet show.

A nine year-old girl and a friend of Yumi.

An eight year-old boy who has a bandage on his nose and is a friend of Yumi and Ami. He likes to play baseball.

Another eight year old and is a friend of Tarou's.

A nine year old boy. He is another child that Rin meets at the puppet show.

A boy who has a crush on Sasami.

Reception

References

External links
Official Little Busters! visual novel character profiles 

Key (company)
Lists of anime and manga characters
Little Busters!